Air Marshal Shahid Lateef (is a retired Pakistan Air Force three-star air marshal, geostrategist and military strategist, and political commentator. Lateef is from Pakistan city of Sahiwal. 

A veteran fighter pilot, Lateef was commissioned in April, 1974 in the Pakistan Air Force (PAF), serving in influential staff appointments during his air force career. He completed an academic degree with top honours, and was awarded a Sword of Honour from the PAF Academy in Risalpur. Lateef has performed duties as a fighter pilot in various squadrons of the PAF and was among the founders of the F-16 induction programme in the PAF.

On March 24, 2017, Lateef accused Nawaz Sharif of a "blasphemous speech" to Karachi's Hindu community.

Biography
In 1970, Lateef was inducted in the PAF Academy in Risalpur, Khyber-Pakhtunkhwa, and participated in the war with India in 1971. Graduated with BA degree in 1974, he stood at the top of his class in his alma mater and conferred with Sword of Honour. He gained commission in 1974 in General Duties Pilot (GDP) branch.

Air Force career
Due to his excellent performance on the Chinese F-6 aircraft, he moved on to the French Mirage at an early stage of his career.

He was chosen in the group of the first six PAF Pilots to undergo F-16 conversion in the United States. Lateef was the first pilot to ferry the F-16 from USA to Pakistan in 1982, and formed part of the pioneer team for training pilots in Pakistan on the F-16 weapon system. With these same pilots he flew numerous combat missions in defence of Pakistan during the Afghan war in the 1980s. He was sent to the United Arab Emirates where he was assigned the command of a Mirage squadron. He was then chosen to command a fighter squadron, fighter wing and a fighter base in the PAF.

He has had numerous key staff appointments at the Air Headquarters including the JF-17 Project.

He was to actively encouraged to the rank of Air vice Marshal, and was given the JF-17 Project; a programme that was not able to start due to difficulties, forcing the PAF to continue to operate obsolete equipment. Through his efforts, the JF-17 project finally came to life.
He served the Air Force of Pakistan from September, 1971 to April, 2006. In recognition of his services he was awarded the Hilal-e-Imtiaz (Military), Sitara-e-Imtiaz (Military) and Sitara-i-Basalat.

Defense analyst
After retirement from the PAF, Lateef started a new career as a defense analyst and appeared on a number of talk shows and gave his expert analysis on geopolitical affairs.

Awards and decorations

Foreign Decorations

See also
 Sohail Aman
 Pakistan Air Force

References

Living people
Pakistan Air Force air marshals
Recipients of Sitara-i-Imtiaz
Recipients of Hilal-i-Imtiaz
Pakistani military personnel of the Indo-Pakistani War of 1971
Pakistan Air Force Academy alumni
Pakistani test pilots
PAF College Sargodha alumni
Year of birth missing (living people)